Luther Halsey Gulick (1892–1993) was an American political scientist, Eaton Professor of Municipal Science and Administration at Columbia University, and Director of its Institute of Public Administration, known as an expert on public administration.

Biography 
Luther Halsey Gulick was born January 17, 1892, in Osaka, Japan. His father was congregationalist missionary Sidney Lewis Gulick (1860–1945) and his mother was Clara May (Fisher) Gulick.  Luther Gulick graduated from Oberlin College in 1914 and received his Ph.D. from Columbia University in 1920.

Gulick taught at Columbia from 1931–1942, where he was appointed Eaton Professor of Municipal Science and Administration. In 1921 he had become president of its Institute of Public Administration and served until 1962. He then became its chairman and served until 1982. From 1936–1938 he served on the three member Committee on Administrative Management (better known as the Brownlow Committee) in 1937 appointed by President Franklin D. Roosevelt to reorganize the executive branch of the federal government.

From 1954 to 1956, he served as city administrator of New York City.

He died January 10, 1993, in Greensboro, Vermont. His first wife Helen Swift died in 1969. His second wife, Carol W. Moffett, died in 1989. He had two children, Luther Halsey Gulick Jr. and Clarence Gulick.

Family tree
Luther Gulick shared his name with his grandfather, missionary Luther Halsey Gulick Sr. (1828–1891), and uncle medical doctor Luther Halsey Gulick Jr. (1865–1918). His great-grandfather was an even earlier missionary to the Kingdom of Hawaii, Peter Johnson Gulick (1796–1877).

Work

POSDCORB 
Among many other accomplishments in the field of public administration, Gulick is perhaps best known for the functions of the chief executive represented in the acronym POSDCORB. Each letter stands for Planning, Organizing, Staffing, Directing, Co-ordinating, Reporting and Budgeting.  Although not originating from Gulick, at least one other sequence has been uncovered, yet containing the same elements.  Since these are among Gulick's organizational patterns, they are interrelated.  According to Gulick, POSDCORB reflected the way in which his organizations approached projects.  Early on, these included The Institute of Public Administration and New York's Bureau of Municipal Research.

Keynesian policies 
Gulick's advocacy (with Alvin Hansen) during World War II of Keynesian policies to promote full employment post-war helped to persuade John Maynard Keynes to help develop post-war plans for the international economy that included considerable emphasis on free trade.

In a time where the prevalent theme was the separation of politics and administration, Gulick advocated that it was impossible to separate the two.

Selected publications 
 Gulick, Luther Halsey. Evolution of the Budget in Massachusetts. Vol. 2. Macmillan, 1920.
 Gulick, Luther, and Lyndall Urwick, eds. Papers on the Science of Administration.  New York: Institute of Public Administration, 1937.
 Gulick, Luther Halsey. Administrative Reflections from World War II. University of Alabama Press, 1948.
 Gulick, Luther Halsey. American forest policy. Duell, Sloan & Pearce, 1951.
 Gulick, Luther Halsey. The Metropolitan Problems and American Ideas. Knopf, 1966.

Articles, a selection:
 Gulick, Luther. 1937. "Notes on the Theory of Organization."  In Gulick, Luther; Urwick, Lyndall. Papers on the Science of Administration. New York: Institute of Public Administration. pp. 3–45.
 Gulick, Luther. 1937. "Science, values and public administration."  In Gulick, Luther; Urwick, Lyndall. Papers on the Science of Administration. New York: Institute of Public Administration. pp. 189–195.

References

External links

 

1892 births
1993 deaths
American centenarians
Men centenarians
Oberlin College alumni
Columbia University alumni
Columbia University faculty
American political scientists
Public administration scholars
American expatriates in Japan
20th-century political scientists